Get the Picture? is the fourth studio album by American rock band Smash Mouth. It was released on August 5, 2003 by Interscope Records. The first released single was "You Are My Number One", which was written by Neil Diamond, and featured guest vocals by Ranking Roger.

"Hang On" was also released as a single, and appears in the end credits of the 2003 film The Cat in the Hat. A music video for "Hang On" was also released, designed specifically for the film. The song "Hot" appears in the 2003 animated film Hot Wheels: World Race and its video game adaptation, as well as the 2010 film Diary of a Wimpy Kid and an episode of What's New, Scooby Doo?

The art for the album was created by Shag.

Track listing
All songs by Greg Camp, except where noted.
 "Hang On" – 2:53
 "Always Gets Her Way" – 3:12
 "You Are My Number One" (feat. Ranking Roger) – 2:32
 "Whole Lotta Love" (Camp, Paul Barry) – 3:21
 "Space Man" – 4:14
 "Hot" (Camp, Barry, Mark Taylor) – 2:31
 "Looking for a Wall" – 3:18
 "Seventh Grade Dance" – 3:30
 "105" – 3:31
 "Fun" – 2:39
 "New Planet" (Camp, Paul De Lisle) – 2:17

Bonus tracks
 "Get the Picture?" – 2:59 UK/Japan bonus track
 "Spooky Thing" (with George Clinton) – 3:37 Japan bonus track
 "Boulevard" – 4:19 Japan bonus track

Personnel
Smash Mouth
Steve Harwell – lead vocals
Paul De Lisle – bass, backing vocals
Greg Camp – guitars, backing vocals
Michael Urbano – drums, percussion
 Michael Klooster – keyboards, backing vocals

Additional personnel
Ranking Roger – vocals on "You Are My Number One"

References

External links

Get the Picture? at YouTube (streamed copy where licensed)
The Official Smash Mouth site
The Official Shag site

Smash Mouth albums
2003 albums
Interscope Records albums